Óscar Alfonso Castro (born December 20, 1986, in Obregón, Sonora), better known as Caloncho, is a Mexican musician and singer.

Biography 

As a child, Caloncho lived in Guadalajara where his favorite activity was playing the drums, until he later decided to experiment with melody. At the same time, he started playing the guitar that his grandfather had left for him years before, and soon learned to play songs from artists such as Bob Marley and Sublime.

Based on his own confession, Caloncho was the name his grandfather and step-sister, Angélica, used to call him when he was very little and since the name never annoyed him, he decided to use it as his musical stage name.

Artistry 

His first EP "Homeotermo"  was recorded in 2011, and soon after, he started working with musician Siddhartha (a former-teacher and friend). He asked him to be his producer and Siddhartha agreed, saying about him: "Caloncho is a newly born musician, he is being newly discovered, both by himself and by those around him. He sent me a sample of his music and I immediately felt it was a musical obligation to help extract the sweet juice from his fruitful melodies." (Caloncho's website).

Caloncho then released his second EP, titled "Fruta" (Fruit), in September 2013. This production mixes his unique musical style with rhythms and stories of Mexican national folk, beaches, and forest rhythms, as well as urban sounds. All these sounds are used to retell different situations from his own life.

"We experimented a lot during the creation of the EP. We used organic sounds and objects that are not considered musical instruments, such as water, fruit, seeds, lighters, etc. I love it and I want to hear it", he said.

Caloncho has admitted that thanks to music, he has been able to live his life through all his senses. Music has also allowed him to feel completely connected with his family. "My dad would write and play songs for us, and he would invite us to build on them, as a way to be in communion with each other," he's said.

In 2015 he published the LP, "Fruta Vol. II" (Fruit Vol. II), a production worked with certain arrangements.

He was nominated for the Latin Grammy Award for Best Alternative Music Album.

Discography 

2011, Homeotermo
2013, Fruta
2015, Fruta Vol. II
2017, Bálsamo
2022, Buen Pez

See also
List of Mexican singers

References

External links

1986 births
Rock en Español musicians
Living people
Mexican musicians
People from Ciudad Obregón